The Chulyshman (Çolışman) is a river in Altai Republic in Russia. The Chulyshman flows into Lake Teletskoye. It freezes up during late October through early December and stays icebound until late March through early May. Its main tributary is the Bashkaus.

References

Rivers of the Altai Republic